Chester-Blandford State Forest is a publicly owned forest with recreational features located in the two towns for which it is named, Chester and Blandford, Massachusetts. The  state forest includes remnants of small mining operations and the 60-foot cascade at Sanderson Brook Falls. It is managed by the Department of Conservation and Recreation.

History
The state forest was established in 1924 when local lumber companies sold land to the state. The Civilian Conservation Corps was active in the forest from 1934 to 1940. Their work included the construction of a campground, pavilions, trails, ski runs, and the road and bridges that lead to Sanderson Brook Falls.

Activities and amenities
Forest trails are used for hiking, horseback riding, mountain biking, and cross-country skiing. Picnicking, restrooms, fishing, restricted hunting, and snowmobiling are also available.

References

External links
Chester-Blandford State Forest Department of Conservation and Recreation
Chester-Blandford State Forest Trail Map Department of Conservation and Recreation

Massachusetts state forests
Parks in Hampden County, Massachusetts
Civilian Conservation Corps in Massachusetts
Protected areas established in 1924
1924 establishments in Massachusetts
State parks of Massachusetts